RimWorld is a construction and management simulation video game developed and published by Montreal-based developer Ludeon Studios. Originally called Eclipse Colony, it was initially released as a Kickstarter crowdfunding project in early access for Microsoft Windows, macOS, and Linux in November 2013, and was officially released on October 17, 2018. The game was also released for PlayStation 4 and Xbox One as RimWorld Console Edition on July 29, 2022, with development and publishing being handled by Double Eleven. Rather than a test of skill or a challenge, the game is intended to serve as an AI-powered "story generator", where the game is used as the medium for players to experience narrative adventures. The game has received generally positive reviews from critics and overwhelmingly positive reviews from PC players on Steam.

Setting and scenarios
The game takes place in the distant future, where humans are spread across the universe but cannot travel faster than the speed of light. Planets and star systems develop in isolation from each other, and while some societies advance technologically, others regress due to war or disease. As a result, there is a massive range of technological levels of societies, from Neolithic tribes to reality-transcending machine gods.

Rimworld has a small variety of starting scenarios to choose from, although the core narrative is the same. The player characters (referred to as "pawns" in game documentation) are stranded on a procedurally generated planet located in the frontiers of known space (a "rim world"). The characters have a randomly generated set of positive or negative traits which affect how they can contribute to or endanger the colony, the decisions they make, and how their existence affects the other characters. As time goes on, more characters will join the colony. Characters can be rescued after crash-landing on the player map, they can wander in, or they can be captured after a raid.

To end the game, the player must either research and construct a spaceship, or find a broken-down ship with the help of a friendly AI. After starting the ship, the player must defend it for fifteen days as other desperate inhabitants of the planet attempt to seize control of it. After escaping the planet with at least one colonist, the credits roll. With the Royalty DLC, the game can also end by hosting the High Stellarch, leader of one of the factions that inhabit the Rim, and leaving the colony with them. With the Ideology DLC the Archonexus ending is made available, which involves selling your colony for part of a map to the Archonexus, a massive AI-controlled computer capable of controlling the entire planet.

Gameplay 
The objective of the game is to ensure the survival of a colony of people, fighting against various environmental and/or internal events through randomly generated events in a customizable world. As the game progresses events become progressively harder and the player can unlock more advanced technology through research. The game has a top down, two-dimensional view.

Random event and "story" generation 
In-game events are procedurally generated by an AI storyteller, which is central to gameplay; game difficulty, event difficulty and difficulty progression depend on its settings. The AI storyteller will analyze the player's current situation and choose events based on what it assesses will make the most interesting narrative. The game has three preconfigured AI storytellers, "Cassandra Classic", who follows traditional storytelling techniques of rising and falling tension, "Phoebe Chillax", a more laid-back storyteller, and "Randy Random", who forsakes narrative altogether in favor of randomness and excitement. There are 6 different preset difficulties to choose from along with a custom difficulty option. These influence the severity and frequency of events as well as the good, neutral, and bad balance of events. Events can range from simple occurrences such as wild animals wandering into the map or spacecraft debris crash landing to catastrophic long-lasting events such as Cold snaps or Volcanic winters. 

The game also has two save-modes. Commitment mode acts as Rimworld's permadeath mode, disabling manual saving, and Reload anytime mode allows the player to save and load freely, giving the player a chance to undo an event.

Characters 
The characters' mental stability is represented by a mood meter, affected by basic or complex needs, personality traits, and character backstories. Characters require food, rest and shelter but will also request a place to sit while eating, well-made and undamaged clothes, or enough time for recreation like stargazing, cloud watching or playing chess. If needs are left unmet, characters may undergo "mental breaks" such as going into a daze or even going berserk and attacking other characters.

With the release of Alpha 13 on April 6, 2016, a new social aspect to the game was introduced. Characters were given the ability to have social relationships with each other, and an opinion system was introduced.These relationships can benefit or detract from the needs and joys of a character, and poor social relationships may result in fights.

Animals in the game may be domesticated or tamed, and can form relationships with human characters, but they cannot be controlled directly by the player. Certain animals may be taught commands, which vary from simply obeying its master to defending them if attacked to occasionally carrying and storing items.

Technological progress 
Players can research new technologies by constructing research stations. Players may harness electricity, which unlocks a plethora of machines and increases the colony's efficiency, but they are forced to find ways to generate electricity, including wind turbines, solar panels, or geothermal power stations. Players can also unlock other advancements like medicine, advanced weaponry, or drugs.

Combat 
Players may be forced into several combative events. For example, during a pirate attack, the player will have to defend the colony by either drafting the characters or by building defensive mechanisms around the colony. Such defensive measures may include traps and automated turrets. A key mechanic in combat is cover. Ducking behind cover, such as trees, walls or sandbags, gives characters a much lower chance of being hit by projectiles during firefights.

Starvation 
Characters in the game need constant nourishment. One of the challenges of a larger colony is finding a way to feed all the colonists. Players may combine hunting, farming, animal husbandry, and trading to meet the colonist's needs. Animals can be lured and tamed with food, but there is a small chance the animal will attack the tamer instead. Upon being tamed, domestic animals can also reproduce.

Colonization 
On December 20, 2016, Alpha version 16 "Wanderlust" was released. Many new features were added regarding the world map, including: a spherical world map, time-zones, factions now starting with many bases, the ability to travel across the whole world map, the ability to set up multiple colonies, world generation, and customizable world map parameters. It is possible for players to attack other bases and plunder resources from them, angering the attacked faction in the process.

Modifications 
Players are able to install modifications (known as "mods") distributed via the Steam Workshop, the game's official forums, or other distribution sites. The game is known for its active modding community, regularly publishing mods from simple quality of life upgrades to complete gameplay overhauls.

Reception 

RimWorld has received "generally favorable" reviews for Windows according to review aggregator Metacritic; the Xbox One version received "universal acclaim". Nomura Hikaru of IGN rated the game 9/10, describing it as "an all-in-one package for management simulation", and writing positively of the way it handled the player failing and its ability to tell a story. Sam Greer of PC Gamer gave a generally positive review, declaring that it was "a rich colony sim" and finding that its mid and late games were entertaining, while criticising its early game as somewhat tedious. Brendan Caldwell of Rock Paper Shotgun wrote positively of the game, praising it as a "wonderful fiasco", and writing positively of its ability to create drama. RimWorld has been favourably compared to other management-survival games such as Dwarf Fortress.

Accolades 
In 2016 RimWorld was voted Indie DB's "indie of the year". In 2018 Rimworld was voted Steam's Top User-Rated Game, from all categories. The game was nominated in 2019 for the category of "Strategy/Simulation Game of the Year" at the 22nd D.I.C.E. Awards. In 2020, RimWorld was ranked the best management game on the PC in Rock Paper Shotgun.

Revenue 
In February 2018, it was announced by Sylvester that RimWorld had sold over a million copies. By August 2020, it was estimated that RimWorld had accumulated well over 100 million dollars in revenue, making it one of the most popular indie games on Steam.

Downloadable content 
On February 24, 2020, the first downloadable content (DLC), Royalty, was released with the 1.1 update, adding a new empire faction and psylink technology for colonists to use. It also introduces the concept of royal titles, mechanoid clusters, 13 more songs to the soundtrack, more possible quests and more body implants and types of weapons.

On July 20, 2021, the second DLC, Ideology, was released with the 1.3 update, adding belief systems based around several memes which make up the core of the ideology. Each ideology adds new buildings, apparel, quests, and social roles. New raid types, animal pens, mortar barrels, and caravan reworks were added as part of the free update.

On 21 October, 2022, the third DLC, Biotech, was released alongside the 1.4 update. The DLC introduced a new mechanoid building mechanic allowing the construction of
robots that can assist the colony with labor or combat, the ability for colonists to become pregnant and raise new families, and new options to genetically modify colonists into xenohumans granting special abilities and traits. New factions with xenohumans have been added ranging from supersoldiers to neanderthals. Pollution emitted from constructed mechanoids can cause severe damage to colonies by causing sickness, sun blockage from smog and awakening of hibernating underground creatures. The update also improved the game's initial loading time by around 37%.

Ban in Australia 
In February 2022, a previously unannounced port of the game for consoles was refused classification by the Australian Classification Board for its depictions of drug use. Following this, the PC version of the game was pulled from the digital storefront Steam for Australian users without input from the developers, with them stating that they were unsure of the reasoning, but were "working to resolve this situation and make RimWorld available to everyone again as soon as possible". On April 20, 2022 the game was classified as R18+ in Australia and was subsequently made available on Steam again.

See also
 Rimworlds

Notes

References

External links 
 

2018 video games
Construction and management simulation games
Linux games
MacOS games
Windows games
Indie video games
Early access video games
Video games developed in Canada
Video games using procedural generation
Video games with Steam Workshop support
Cryonics in fiction
Video games scored by Alastair Lindsay
Double Eleven (company) games
Single-player video games